is a railway station in the city of Nasukarasuyama, Tochigi, Japan, operated by the East Japan Railway Company (JR East).

Lines

Station layout
The station consists of one side platform serving a single track. The station formerly had a "Midori no Madoguchi" staffed ticket office, but this closed from August 2013, and tickets are available only from ticket vending machines.

In February 2012, a recharging facility was built at the station for use by the experimental NE Train battery railcar, which is undergoing testing on the line. The recharging facility consists of a rigid overhead conductor enabling the train to be recharged via its pantograph. The overhead conductor bar is electrified at 1,500 V DC, powered from the local electricity grid 6.6 kV AC supply.

Platforms

History
The station opened on 15 April 1923.

Surrounding area
 Nasukarasuyama City Office
 Karasuyama High School
 Naka River
 
 Karasuyama Post Office

Bus routes

 Karasuyama Municipal Bus - For Takabe Shako and Ichihana Station via Motegi Station
 Nakagawa Community Bus - For Nakagawa Village Hall

Passenger statistics
In fiscal 2019, the station was used by an average of 537 passengers daily (boarding passengers only).

See also
 List of railway stations in Japan

References

External links

 JR East Station information 

Railway stations in Tochigi Prefecture
Railway stations in Japan opened in 1923
Karasuyama Line
Nasukarasuyama
Stations of East Japan Railway Company